The 1999 Newsweek Champions Cup and the Evert Cup were tennis tournaments played on outdoor hard courts. It was the 26th edition of the Indian Wells Masters and was part of the Super 9 of the 1999 ATP Tour and of Tier I of the 1999 WTA Tour. Both the men's and women's tournaments took place at the Grand Champions Resort in Indian Wells, California in the United States from March 5 through March 14, 1999.

Finals

Men's singles

 Mark Philippoussis defeated  Carlos Moyá, 5–7, 6–4, 6–4, 4–6, 6–2
 It was Philippoussis' 2nd title of the year and the 10th of his career. It was his 1st Super 9 title.

Women's singles

 Serena Williams defeated  Steffi Graf, 6–3, 3–6, 7–5
 It was Williams' 3rd title of the year and the 7th of her career. It was her 1st Tier I title.

Men's doubles

 Wayne Black /  Sandon Stolle defeated   Ellis Ferreira /  Rick Leach, 7–6(7–4), 6–3

Women's doubles

 Martina Hingis /  Anna Kournikova defeated  Mary Joe Fernández /  Jana Novotná, 6–2, 6–2

WTA entrants

Seeds

Other entrants
The following players received wildcards into the singles main draw:
  Alexandra Stevenson
  Mary Joe Fernández
  Olga Barabanschikova
  Lilia Osterloh

The following players received wildcards into the doubles main draw:
  Olga Barabanschikova /  Magüi Serna
  Steffi Graf /  Anke Huber

The following players received entry from the singles qualifying draw:
  Alicia Molik
  Brie Rippner
  Barbara Rittner
  Tatiana Panova
  Miho Saeki
  María Sánchez Lorenzo
  Andrea Glass
  Jessica Steck

The following players received entry from the doubles qualifying draw:
  Kristie Boogert /  Anne-Gaëlle Sidot

References

External links
 
 Association of Tennis Professionals (ATP) tournament profile
 WTA tournament profile

Newsweek Champions Cup
Evert Cup
Indian Wells Masters
Champions Cup and the Evert Cup
Champions Cup and the Evert Cup
Champions Cup and the Evert Cup